Kumkuma Puvvu ( Saffron flower) is an Indian Telugu soap opera that airs on Star Maa and streams on Disney+ Hotstar. It is a remake of Asianet's Malayalam television series Kumkumapoovu. It stars Haritha, Princy B Krishnan and Vaishu Sundar in lead roles. The series follows its third generation leap.

Plot 
Jayanthi and her illegitimate daughter Amrutha are separated at Amrutha's birth, with Jayanthi misled into believing her daughter had died while the girl is raised by a butcher, Manikyam, who treats her unkindly. Rescued from the butcher, Amrutha is raised in a better home with a foster brother, Sandeep. When Sandeep marries Jayanthi's second daughter, Siri (who hates Amrutha), Jayanthi realizes who Amrutha is. Amrutha marries Rudra, a local goon. When Rudra is murdered by an enemy, Amrutha becomes a widow and finds her father and mother and she becomes pregnant.

She gives birth to a daughter, Anjali, whom she presumes dead in a fire accident. Amrutha goes insane while Anjali is raised by Kiran and Renuka (Jayanthi's legitimate son and daughter-in-law). After several years, Siri has a daughter Jaanu and she is separated from Sandeep. The family does not know that Anjali is Amrutha's daughter. Anjali does not accept Amrutha but eventually realizes her love for her. Renuka begins to hold a grudge against Amrutha. Amrutha moves on and remarries Arun, who is not ready to accept Anjali. He banishes Amrutha after learning that she is unable to conceive. However, he takes her back after learning that he cannot father children.

Arun pretends to accept Anjali but does not love her, which hurts her. Rudra is revealed to be alive and returns after plastic surgery as Shiva and joins as a driver at Arun's office. Arun suspects that Shiva is Rudra. Amrutha gets pregnant and Arun suspects that the baby is Shiva's baby. Arun accepts Amrutha when Jayanthi gets medical reports that Arun can become father. Jayanthi lies that that Amrutha is dead to prevent Rudra from spoiling Amrutha's new happiness. Arun learns that Shiva is Rudra and pretends to be normal so that he can snatch away Amrutha's property. Anjali and Rudra leave the city and Rudra gets diagnosed with blood cancer and leaves Anjali with a nun named Sister Mary and dies. Anjali returns as Amulya to help Amrutha.

Cast

Main 
 Haritha Thota as Jayanthi – Jayachandra's ex-lover; Raghuram's wife; Amrutha, Siri and Kiran's mother; Anjali, Jaanu, Rahul, Jaya and Vaishnavi's grandmother
 Princy B Krishnan as Amrutha – Jayanthi and Jayachandra's daughter; Raghuram's step-daughter; Sandeep's foster sister; Siri and Kiran's half-sister; Rudhra's widow; Arun's wife; Anjali, Rahul and Vaishnavi's mother
 Vaishu Sundar / Akshita Satyanarayan as Anjali aka Amulya – Amrutha and Rudhra's daughter; Arun's step-daughter; Renuka and Kiran's former foster daughter; Rahul and Vaishnavi's half-sister; Bunty's wife 
 Tanishka as Child Anjali

Recurring 
Nithin Adwi as Vinay aka Bunty – Kaveri and Chandra's son; Anjali's husband.
Venkat Showrya as Child Vinay aka Bunty
Prajwal Poorvik as Rahul – Amrutha and Arun's son; Vashnavi's brother; Anjali's half-brother; Jaya's husband
Alankritha as Vaishnavi – Amrutha and Arun's daughter; Rahul's sister; Anjali's half-sister; Vicky's wife
Vaishnavi Krishna as Jaya – Renuka and Kiran's daughter; Rahul's wife.
Ganesh Reddy as Vicky – Vaishnavi's husband
Jackie Thota as Raghuram – Jayanthi's husband; Siri and Kiran's father; Amrutha's step-father; Jaanu and Jaya's grandfather; Anjali, Rahul, Vaishnavi's step-grandfather
Srinivas as Jayachandra – Jayanthi's ex-lover; Amrutha's father; Anjali, Rahul and Vaishnavi's grandfather (Dead)
Kaushik Srikrishna as Arun – Umadevi's son; Kaveri's brother; Amrutha's second husband; Rahul and Vaishnavi's father; Anjali's step-father
 Madhu Prakash / Sathwik Chowdary as Rudhra – Tripuramba's son; Amrutha's first husband; Anjali's father (Dead)
Divyavani as Sister Mary – Anjali's caretaker 
 Nirupam Paritala as Sandeep – Amrutha's foster brother; Siri's husband; Jaanu's father.
 Vishnu Priya / Sandra Jaichandran as Siri – Jayanthi and Raghuram's daughter; Kiran's sister; Amrutha's half-sister; Sandeep's wife; Jaanu's mother
 Aaradhya Arukula as Jaanu – Sandeep and Siri's daughter
 Nirmala Reddy as Tripuramba aka Peddarayudamma – Rudhra's mother; Raghuram's aunt; Anjali's grandmother
 Suresh Chandra as Kiran – Jayanthi and Raghuram's son; Siri's brother; Amrutha's half-brother; Renuka's husband; Jaya's father
 Anusha Santosh as Renuka – Kiran's wife; Jaya's mother
Rishika Singh as Kaveri – Umadevi's daughter; Arun's sister; Chandra's wife; Bunty's mother
Chandu Dava as Chandra – Kaveri's husband; Bunty's father
 Padmini Jagadeesh as Umadevi – Arun and Kaveri's mother; Rahul, Bunty and Vaisnavi's grandmother; Anjali's step-grandmother (Dead)
Ankitha as Sithara – Kiran's girlfriend
Vikram as Nagaraju
Chinni Krishna as Sagar
Lirisha as Aruna
Padmini/Seetha Mahalakshmi as Swapna
Bhavana as Prathiba
Kishore Krishna as Surendra
Bhel Prasad as Manikyam
Srihari as Chakri
Maithili as Amulya
Pratap Singh Shah as Akash
Lakshmi as Sangeetha
Janaki Verma as sujatha
Balaji as Inspector Sharath
Nata Kumari as Rajalakshmi
Kalki Raja as Anand
Shripriya Sreekar as Manikyam's wife
Padma Peesapati as Doctor

Adaptations

Reception
Initially aired at a prime time slot, it remained one of the top five most watched Telugu GEC until being shifted to an afternoon slot towards the end of 2018.

References

External links 

 Kumkuma Puvvu on Disney+ Hotstar
 

Indian television soap operas
Serial drama television series
2016 Indian television series debuts
Telugu-language television shows
Indian drama television series
Star Maa original programming